The Longyan–Xiamen railway is a dual-track, electrified, high-speed rail line in Fujian Province, China. Construction began on December 25, 2006, and the line opened for regular operation on June 29, 2012.

Routing
From Longyan, in southwestern Fujian, the Longxia railway runs to the southeast, crossing the Boping Mountains, and following the Western Stream to the Longhai railway station near Zhangzhou (at ), to the west of the new Zhangzhou railway station. From the Longhai station, the Longxia line runs parallel to the Yingtan–Xiamen railway to the Xinglin station on the Xiamen coast.

The Longyan–Xiamen railway is the first railway to enter Fujian's Nanjing County. The two stations within the county are "Nanjing" (which, however, is not  particularly close to the county seat, Shancheng) and Longshan. They serve the county's eastern and northern part.

Rail connections
 Longyan: Zhangping–Longchuan railway, Ganzhou–Longyan railway
 Zhangzhou: Yingtan–Xiamen railway, Xiamen–Shenzhen railway
 Xiamen: Yingtan–Xiamen railway, Fuzhou–Xiamen railway, Xiamen–Shenzhen railway

See also

 List of railways in China

References

Railway lines in China
Rail transport in Xiamen
Longyan
Railway lines opened in 2012